Li Beiqun is currently President of Nanjing University of Information Science and Technology, located in Nanjing, China. Under his leadership, the university saw a drop in the international ranking consistently for three consecutive years in 2021, 2022 and 2023.

Early life
Li was born in 1969 in Xinyi, Jiangsu province, China. In 1991, he received his bachelor degree in climatology from Nanjing University. He then received his masters and Ph.D. degrees in higher education from the same university in 1998 and 2011 respectively.

Career
From 1999-2001, he was assistant director of the Office of President, Nanjing University of Information Science and Technology. From 2001-2010, he assumed various administrative roles at the university, at planning, higher education and capital construction departments. From 2010-2014, he became a vice president of the university. In 2017. he was appointed president. In 2018, he led in the formation of a graduate school and research institute at Wuxi, China. He also led the university in collaborating with the University of Bahamas.

Awards
In 2011, he received the Jiangsu Prize in teaching achievement for higher education. In 2014, he received the first prize in national teaching achievement.

References

1969 births
Living people
Nanjing University alumni
Chinese educators